Henny Schilder (born 4 September 1984) is a Dutch former football player who played as a centre back.

Career
Schilder started his career in the youth of RKAV Volendam. He was picked up by FC Volendam, and was added to the first team in the 2005-06 season. He made his professional debut in the Eerste Divisie on 8 September 2006, in the 3–1 lost away-match against FC Eindhoven. He came on as a substitute for Rowin van Zaanen in the 67th minute.

References

External links
 Voetbal International profile 

1984 births
Living people
People from Volendam
Dutch footballers
Association football defenders
FC Volendam players
Eerste Divisie players
Eredivisie players
Vierde Divisie players
Footballers from North Holland